The following is a list of NCAA Division I universities in the United States (listed alphabetically by their schools' athletic brand name) and their current athletic director.  This list only includes schools playing Division I football or men's basketball.  Schools are alphabetized by commonly used short name, regardless of their official name. The abbreviation "St.", for "Saint", is alphabetized as if it were spelled out.

Athletic directors

See also
National Association of Collegiate Directors of Athletics
List of college athletic programs by U.S. state

Footnotes

References 

List
Athletic directors